Moussa Boureïma Ouattara (born 31 December 1981) is a Burkinabé former professional footballer who played as a defender.

Club career
Ouattara was born in Bobo Dioulasso, Burkina Faso. He previously played for Legia Warsaw in the Polish Ekstraklasa and then 1. FC Kaiserslautern in the German 2. Bundesliga.

International career
Ouattara was a member of the Burkinabé 2004 African Nations Cup team. He finished bottom of their group in the first round of competition failing to secure qualification for the quarter-finals.

References

External links

Living people
1981 births
People from Bobo-Dioulasso
Association football defenders
Burkinabé footballers
Burkinabé expatriate footballers
Burkina Faso international footballers
2004 African Cup of Nations players
2010 Africa Cup of Nations players
Tours FC players
US Créteil-Lusitanos players
Legia Warsaw players
ASFA Yennenga players
1. FC Kaiserslautern players
SC Fortuna Köln players
Ekstraklasa players
2. Bundesliga players
Expatriate footballers in France
Expatriate footballers in Germany
Expatriate footballers in Poland
Burkinabé expatriate sportspeople in France
Burkinabé expatriate sportspeople in Poland
21st-century Burkinabé people